is a railway station on the Sanin Main Line located in Hamada, Shimane Prefecture, Japan, operated by West Japan Railway Company (JR West).

Layout
The station has one track and a side platform.

Adjacent stations

History
Kushiro Station started its operation on March 1, 1959.

External links 
 
 Kushiro Station - JR West website 

Sanin Main Line
Railway stations in Shimane Prefecture
Railway stations in Japan opened in 1959
Stations of West Japan Railway Company